Thomas Sherman may refer to:

Sports
Tom Sherman (American football) (born 1945), retired NFL quarterback
Tom Sherman (cricketer) (1825–1911), English cricketer

Others
Thomas Sherman (MP) for Lewes (UK Parliament constituency)
Tommy Sherman, fictional character in Daria
Thomas Ewing Sherman (1856–1933), lawyer and priest
Thomas W. Sherman (1813–1879), United States Army officer
Tom Sherman (politician) (born 1957), doctor and New Hampshire state representative
Tom Sherman (artist) (born 1947), American-Canadian visual and media artist